The following are among the principal radioactive materials   known to emit alpha particles.

 209Bi, 211Bi, 212Bi, 213Bi
 210Po, 211Po, 212Po, 214Po, 215Po, 216Po, 218Po
 215At, 217At, 218At
 218Rn, 219Rn, 220Rn, 222Rn, 226Rn
 221Fr
 223Ra, 224Ra, 226Ra
 225Ac, 227Ac
 227Th, 228Th, 229Th, 230Th, 232Th
 231Pa
 233U, 234U, 235U, 236U, 238U
 237Np
 238Pu,  239Pu, 240Pu, 244Pu
 241Am
 244Cm, 245Cm, 248Cm
 249Cf, 252Cf

Alpha emitting
Alpha emitting